Central Nacional de Televisão (English: National Television Center) also known as CNT and Rede CNT, is a Brazilian television network based in Curitiba, state of Paraná. Part of the Organizações Martinez Group, it aired for the first time in 1979 initially as TV Tropical.

History 
CNT was founded on March 15, 1979 by entrepreneur and politician José Carlos Martinez as a local station called TV Tropical, originally affiliated to Globo Network until it was sold to Diários Associados in 1980. In 1982, the station was renamed as Rede OM, and was subsequently renamed as CNT in 1993 after becoming a national network the previous year. CNT is currently chaired by entrepreneur and politician (and brother) Flávio de Castro Martinez, who took over after José Carlos Martinez's death in 2003.

Partnership with Televisa 
The television network CNT closed contract with the Mexican television network Televisa, going to show the soap Manancial in August 2008. Televisa's other productions came as Sueños y caramels, SOS: Sexo y otros Secretos and Y ahora qué hago?.

Coverage of the CNT 
With broadcasters themselves, affiliates and repeaters,	CNT based network to a program of national scope in recent years working from five strategic poles: Rio de Janeiro, São Paulo, Salvador, Brasilia and Curitiba. Reaches more than 15 million households, equivalent to 50 million viewers, a large part of Brazil (5 stations and 43 repeaters). And during the coming years to improve its fleet and expand its technical signal to all of Brazil.

Digital broadcasts 
The CNT was the first to use this technology for its stations and affiliates starting in 1999. The stations comprising the network receive programming in digital quality using Embratel satellite channeling.

Programs

References 

Television networks in Brazil
Companies based in Curitiba
Portuguese-language television networks
Television channels and stations established in 1979
Mass media in Curitiba